Angelo Mattea (21 October 1892 – 1960) was an Italian football player and manager from Santhià in the Province of Vercelli. He played club football as a forward or midfielder for several teams in Italy including Casale, which he helped to win the 1913–14 scudetto, and Juventus. He also played for the Italy national football team five different times between 1914 and 1921, scoring once.

Mattea currently holds the record for being the oldest player ever to score their first Serie A goal, a feat which he accomplished at the age of 38 years and 7 days, for Casale, in a 5–1 away loss to Ambrosiana on 28 October 1930.

Honours
Casale
Italian Football Championship: 1913–14

Notes

References

1892 births
1960 deaths
People from Santhià
Association football midfielders
Association football forwards
Italian footballers
Italy international footballers
Italian football managers
Juventus F.C. players
Casale F.B.C. players
S.S.C. Napoli managers
Atalanta B.C. managers
Serie A players
Torino F.C. players
Footballers from Piedmont
Sportspeople from the Province of Vercelli